Clotiazepam (marketed under brand name Clozan, Distensan, Trecalmo, Rize, Rizen and Veratran) is a thienodiazepine drug which is a benzodiazepine analog. The clotiazepam molecule differs from benzodiazepines in that the benzene ring has been replaced by a thiophene ring. It possesses anxiolytic, skeletal muscle relaxant, anticonvulsant, sedative properties. Stage 2 NREM sleep is significantly increased by clotiazepam.

Indications
Clotiazepam has been trialed and found to be effective in the short-term management of anxiety. Clotiazepam is also used as a premedicant in minor surgery in France and Japan, where the drug is commercially available under the brand names Veratran and Rize, respectively.

Pharmacokinetics
A cross-over study in six healthy volunteers (median age 28 years) was conducted using single-dose pharmacokinetics of 5 mg clotiazepam drops, oral tablets, and sublingual tablets. The formulations had similar systemic availability. Compared with oral tablets, the sublingual route gave a lower peak concentration and a delayed peak time, while drops gave a greater maximum concentration with a similar peak time. The use of drops is suggested for a more marked initial effect and the sublingual route for easier administration, especially in the elderly.

Pharmacology
Similar to other benzodiazepines clotiazepam has anxiolytic, sedative, hypnotic, amnesic, anticonvulsant and muscle relaxant pharmacological properties. Clotiazepam binds to the benzodiazepine site of the GABAA receptor where it acts as a full agonist; this action results in an enhanced GABA inhibitory effect at the GABAA receptor which results in the pharmacological effects of clotiazepam.

Clotiazepam has a short elimination half-life and is less prone to accumulation after repeated dosing compared to longer-acting benzodiazepine agents. It is metabolised via oxidation. Clotiazepam is metabolised to hydroxy-clotiazepam and desmethyl-clotiazepam. After oral ingestion of a single 5 mg dose of clotiazepam by three healthy volunteers the drug was rapidly absorbed. The elimination half-life of the drug and its metabolites range from 6.5 hours to 18 hours. Clotiazepam is 99 percent bound to plasma protein. In elderly men the elimination half-life is longer and in elderly women the volume of distribution is increased. Individuals with liver impairment have a reduced volume of distribution as well as a reduced total clearance of clotiazepam; renal impairment does not affect the kinetics of clotiazepam.

The dose equivalent to 10 mg diazepam is thought to be between 5 and 10 mg clotiazepam.

Side effects
Side effects experienced with this product will resemble those of other benzodiazepines.
Drowsiness and asthenia are common side effects. There has been a report of reversible hepatitis caused by clotiazepam.

Abuse
Clotiazepam is a recognised drug of abuse.

See also 
List of benzodiazepines
Etizolam
Ro09-9212

References

External links 
 Inchem.org - Clotiazepam

Chloroarenes
GABAA receptor positive allosteric modulators
Lactams
Thienodiazepines